Newtown is an unincorporated community and census-designated place (CDP) in Dillon County, South Carolina, United States. It was first listed as a CDP prior to the 2020 census which listed a population of 770.

The CDP is in central Dillon County, on the south side of Dillon, the county seat. Development is continuous between the two communities.

South Carolina Highway 57 passes through Newtown, leading north into Dillon and southeast  to Fork.

Demographics

2020 census

Note: the US Census treats Hispanic/Latino as an ethnic category. This table excludes Latinos from the racial categories and assigns them to a separate category. Hispanics/Latinos can be of any race.

References 

Census-designated places in Dillon County, South Carolina
Census-designated places in South Carolina